Rhymes is an unincorporated community in Richland Parish, Louisiana, United States. The community is located   SW of Rayville, Louisiana.

Name origin
It is speculated that the name of the community is derived from the local Rhymes plantation that was built during the Antebellum period.

References

Unincorporated communities in Richland Parish, Louisiana
Unincorporated communities in Louisiana